Trinity Theological College may refer to: 

 Trinity Theological College, Perth, an evangelical Christian college
 Trinity Theological College, Singapore, an ecumenical Christian college
 Trinity College, Bristol, an Anglican theological college
 Trinity College of Florida, an interdenominational evangelical theological college
 Trinity College, Glasgow, a Church of Scotland theological college within the University of Glasgow
 Trinity College Queensland, a theological college of the Uniting Church in Australia
 Holy Trinity College, Catholic University of Zimbabwe, a Roman Catholic theological college
 Trinity College Theological School, part of Trinity College, Melbourne, and the University of Divinity
 Theological College of the Holy Trinity, a college of the Ethiopian Orthodox Church
 Trinity Bible College and Graduate School, a Pentecostal theological college
 Trinity College of the Bible and Theological Seminary, a distance-learning evangelical theological college

See also 

 Trinity Seminary (disambiguation)
 Trinity Theological Seminary (disambiguation)